The 1959–60 Botola is the 4th season of the Moroccan Premier League. KAC Kénitra are the holders of the title.

References
Morocco 1959/60

Botola seasons
Morocco
Botola